The 2012 season of the Belgian Football League (BFL) is the regular season played in the Belgium. The championship game is the Belgian Bowl XXV.

Regular season

Regular season standings
W = Wins, L = Losses, T = Ties, PCT = Winning Percentage, PF= Points For, PA = Points Against

 – clinched seed to the playoffs

Post season

In the Wild Card Playoffs both teams of the FFL won their games.  The top ranked team of the FFL, the Brussels Bulls lost in the Semifinals against the Antwerp Diamonds.  In the regular season the Bulls won all but one game, that was the game against the Diamonds.  The Brussels Tigers made a perfect season winning all eight games in the LFFAB and also the two games in the playoffs including the Belgian Bowl.

The Belgian Bowl XXV was held on June 9, 2012 in Ostend.  The Brussels Tigers won over the Antwerp Diamonds in a rematch of Belgian Bowl XV .  It was the second time for the Brussels Tigers to win the national trophy.

References

External links
Official Belgian Bowl website
Dale's FFL thoughts - FFL Blog

American football in Belgium
BFL
BFL